Jens Sebastian Beraque Rasmussen (born June 17, 2002) is a footballer who plays as a forward or left-back for Danish team Hobro II. Born in Denmark, he plays for the Philippines national team.

Club career
A former youth academy player of Randers, Rasmussen joined AGF in 2019. He returned to Randers in 2021 and became the part of reserve team Randers Freja.

International career
In October 2021, Rasmussen was called up to the Philippines under-23 team for 2022 AFC U-23 Asian Cup qualification matches.

In November 2022, Rasmussen was named in the Philippines national team squad for the 2022 AFF Championship. On December 23, 2022, he made his debut for the team by scoring two goals and providing an assist in a 5–1 win against Brunei.

Personal life
Rasmussen was born in Denmark to a Danish father and a Filipino mother.

Career statistics

International

Scores and results list Philippines' goal tally first, score column indicates score after each Rasmussen goal.

References

External links
 
 

2002 births
Living people
Association football forwards
Filipino footballers
Philippines international footballers
Danish men's footballers
Filipino people of Danish descent
Danish people of Filipino descent